Collegiate church of Santa María may refer to:

 Collegiate church of Santa María (Calatayud)
 Collegiate church of Santa María (Tudela)